The following lists events that happened during 1984 in Brunei.

Events

January

 January 1 - Brunei becomes a fully independent state as a monarchy within the Commonwealth of Nations with the Sultan of Brunei as its ruler.

 January 7 - Brunei becomes the sixth member of the Association of Southeast Asian Nations.

References

 
1980s in Brunei
Years of the 20th century in Brunei
Brunei
Brunei